Canadian Cowboy Country is a Canadian magazine of Western culture and lifestyle. It is published by Rob Tanner. The publication was founded in 1997. The magazine was purchased by Tanner Young Publishing Group in 2001. Editorial offices are located in Edmonton, Alberta, Canada.

References

External links
 Official website

1997 establishments in Alberta
Bi-monthly magazines published in Canada
Lifestyle magazines published in Canada
Magazines established in 1997
Magazines published in Alberta
Mass media in Edmonton